Alabora is a Turkish surname. Notable people with the surname include:

 Derya Alabora (born 1959), Turkish actress
 Memet Ali Alabora (born 1977), Turkish actor

Turkish-language surnames